Charles Egbert Stanton (November 22, 1858 – May 8, 1933) was an officer in the United States Army, and attained the rank of colonel.  A veteran of the Spanish–American War, and served as chief disbursing officer and aide to General John J. Pershing during World War I. Stanton was the nephew of Abraham Lincoln's Secretary of War, Edwin M. Stanton. He is best known for having included the memorable expression "Lafayette, we are here!" in a speech he gave in Paris during the First World War.

Early life
Charles E. Stanton was born in Monticello, Illinois on November 22, 1858. As a boy he was raised in part along the roadbed of the Union Pacific Railroad during its construction as part of the First transcontinental railroad; his father ran businesses that catered to the construction crews, and was operating the railroad hotel at Promontory, Utah when the railroad was completed in 1869. At the ceremony on Promontory Summit where engines of the Union Pacific and the Central Pacific Railroad touched cowcatchers to symbolize the opening of the transcontinental route, Stanton rode in the UP's engine and rang the engine's bell.

Stanton was educated in San Francisco, and then attended Santa Clara University and Yale University. He worked at silver mines in Nevada, farmed in Minnesota, sold mineral water for a company in Idaho, and sold fire extinguishers in San Francisco. He served as Chief Clerk of the Utah Territorial Assembly, and Salt Lake County Clerk. He was a delegate to the Utah constitutional convention which resulted in statehood in 1895.

Army career
In 1898 Stanton was appointed a paymaster of volunteers in the United States Army with the rank of major. He served in the Philippines during the Spanish–American War, and after his 1901 discharge accepted a regular Army commission as a captain in the paymaster corps. He continued to serve in the army, and at the start of World War I he was a lieutenant colonel on the staff of John J. Pershing. He served as chief disbursing officer for the American Expeditionary Forces, and received the Distinguished Service Medal and the French Legion of Honor.

Stanton retired as a colonel in 1921.

Later career
After retiring from the army, Stanton served as a member of San Francisco's Board of Public Works. In 1931 he was enrolled in the American Legion as its one millionth member.

Stanton died in San Francisco on May 8, 1933. He was buried at Cypress Lawn Memorial Park in Colma, California.

Lafayette quote
On July 4, 1917, Stanton visited the tomb of French Revolution and American Revolution hero Marquis de Lafayette and (according to Pershing) said, "Lafayette, we are here!" to honor the nobleman's assistance during the Revolutionary War and assure the French people that the people of the United States would aid them in World War I. The famous quote is often misattributed to Pershing.

In context, he said: America has joined forces with the Allied Powers, and what we have of blood and treasure are yours. Therefore it is that with loving pride we drape the colors in tribute of respect to this citizen of your great republic. And here and now, in the presence of the illustrious dead, we pledge our hearts and our honor in carrying this war to a successful issue. Lafayette, we are here!

References

Notes
 George, John H. and Paul Boller (1989). They Never Said It. Oxford: Oxford University Press.
 McHenry, Robert and Charles Van Doren (1971). Webster's Guide to American History. New York: Merriam.
 (1917). "Record Crowd in Paris." The New York Times. July 6.
 Unger, Harlow Giles (2002). Lafayette. New York: Wiley.

1858 births
1933 deaths
United States Army personnel of World War I
United States Army colonels
Santa Clara University alumni
People from Monticello, Illinois
Military personnel from Illinois
Burials at Cypress Lawn Memorial Park